Ragnhild Fjermeros Hald (November 9, 1896 – July 17, 1975) was a Norwegian actress.

After attending high school from 1910 to 1913, she studied under Inga Jacobi. She was then engaged with the Norwegian Theater from 1919 to 1952, as well as the National Theater from 1930 to 1933, and finally with the People's Theater from 1952 onward.

She was married to the actor Nils Hald from 1922 to 1938, and then to the visual artist Rolf Nesch from 1950 to 1975.

Awards
1938: Hulda Garborg scholarship
1946: first honorary award from the Norwegian Association of Artists with a prize of NOK 6,000
1951/52: Norwegian Theatre Critics Award for her role as Nille in The Madwoman of Chaillot by Jean Giraudoux
1960: King's Medal of Merit in gold

Filmography
1922: Farende folk as a young woman (uncredited)
1932: En glad gutt as Øyvind's mother
1938: Det drønner gjennom dalen as Laura, Knut's wife
1938: Ungen as Hønse-Lovisa
1939: Gryr i Norden as Halldis, a manager
1940: Godvakker-Maren as Andreas's wife
1941: Gullfjellet as Olea, a dairy maid
1946: Vi vil leve as Harald's mother
1951: Storfolk og småfolk as Ander's wife
1962: Kalde spor

References

External links
 
 Ragnhild Hald at the Swedish Film Database

1896 births
1975 deaths
20th-century Norwegian actresses
Norwegian silent film actresses
Recipients of the King's Medal of Merit in gold
Burials at Vestre gravlund
Actresses from Oslo